Oandu is a village in Haljala Parish, Lääne-Viru County, in northern Estonia, on the territory of Lahemaa National Park.

References

External links
Oandu Nature Centre 

Villages in Lääne-Viru County